is a 1971 Japanese comedy film directed by Yoji Yamada. It stars Kiyoshi Atsumi as Torajirō Kuruma (Tora-san), and Rumi Sakakibara as his love interest or "Madonna". Tora-san, the Good Samaritan is the seventh entry in the popular, long-running Otoko wa Tsurai yo series.

Cast
 Kiyoshi Atsumi as Torajirō
 Chieko Baisho as Sakura
 Rumi Sakakibara as Hanako Ōta
 Sachiko Mitsumoto as Fuyuko
 Chōchō Miyako as Kiku
 Kunie Tanaka as Prof. Fukui
 Hiroshi Ōtsuka as Policeman
 Gin Maeda as Hiroshi Suwa
 Chieko Misaki as Torajiro's aunt
 Hisao Dazai as Tarō Ume

Critical appraisal
For his work on Tora-san, the Good Samaritan, the previous entry in the Otoko wa Tsurai yo series, Tora-san's Shattered Romance, and the following entry, Tora-san's Love Call (all 1971), Yoji Yamada tied for Best Director at the Mainichi Film Awards with Masahiro Shinoda. The German-language site molodezhnaja gives Tora-san, the Good Samaritan three and a half out of five stars.

Availability
Tora-san, the Good Samaritan was released theatrically on April 28, 1971. In Japan, the film was released on videotape in 1983 and 1995, and in DVD format in 1998 and 2008.

References

Bibliography

English

German

Japanese

External links
 Tora-san, the Good Samaritan at www.tora-san.jp (official site)

1971 films
Films directed by Yoji Yamada
1971 comedy films
1970s Japanese-language films
Otoko wa Tsurai yo films
Shochiku films
Films with screenplays by Yôji Yamada
Japanese sequel films
1970s Japanese films